Lisa Ellis may refer to: 
Lisa Ellis (martial artist) (b. 1982), American mixed martial artist
Lisa Ellis (American politician) (b. 1975), American educator and politician 
Lisa Ellis (political scientist), New Zealand political scientist 
Lisa Ellis (executive producer) (b. 1970), American businessperson and financier